The transportation needs for the city of Charlotte, North Carolina are served by an expanding mass transit system, major airport, and several highways.

Mass transit

 The Charlotte Area Transit System (CATS) is the agency responsible for operating mass transit in the Charlotte Metropolitan Area.
CATS operates light rail transit, streetcar service, express shuttles, and bus service serving Charlotte and its immediate suburbs. The LYNX system comprises a 19.3-mile long north-south light rail line known as the Blue Line and a  1.5-mile streetcar line, known as the CityLYNX Gold Line. The Blue Line was extended from the original section, I-485 to Uptown, to the UNC Charlotte campus in 2018. Bus ridership has declined in the system along with a nationwide trend in ridership
The 2030 Transit Corridor System Plan looks to add more light rail and bus rapid transit lines in Charlotte as well as add a commuter rail line.

Air

Charlotte/Douglas International Airport is the 11th busiest airport in the world, as measured by traffic. It is served by many domestic airlines, as well as international airlines Air Canada and Lufthansa, and is the second largest hub for American Airlines. Nonstop flights are available to many destinations across the United States, as well as flights to Canada, Central America, the Caribbean, Europe, Mexico, and South America.

Roads and highways
Charlotte's central location between the population centers of the northeast and southeast has made it a transportation focal point and primary distribution center, with two major interstate highways, Interstate 85 (I-85) and I-77, intersecting near the city's center. Within the city, the I-277 loop freeway encircles Charlotte's uptown (usually referred to by its two separate sections, the John Belk Freeway and the Brookshire Freeway) while Charlotte Route 4 links major roads in a loop between I-277 and I-485.

Trade Street and Tryon Street are the central thoroughfares though Uptown Charlotte. The intersection of Trade and Tryon marks the center point of the city, dividing the city's first four wards.

Charlotte Route 4 is a partial ring road utilizing many existing two-lane roads around the south and east sides of the city.  It is denoted by a pentagonal county road shield, with a green background and the city's crown logo above the number.

Other major thoroughfares include: Albemarle Road (part of NC 24 and NC 27), Arrowood Road, Atando Avenue, Beatties Ford Road, Billy Graham Parkway, Brookshire Boulevard (part of NC 16), Carson Boulevard, Central Avenue, Charlottetowne Avenue, Clanton Road, Davidson Street, East Boulevard, Eastway Drive, Elizabeth Avenue, Fairview Road, Freedom Drive (part of NC 27), Graham Street (part of U.S. Route 29 (US 29) and NC 49), Hawthorne Lane, Idlewild Road, Independence Boulevard (part of US 74 and NC 27), Johnston Road, Kenilworth Avenue, Kings Drive, LaSalle Street, Lawyers Road, Little Rock Road, Mallard Creek Road, McDowell Street (part of NC 27), Mint Street, Monroe Road, Morehead Street (part of US 29 and NC 27), Mt. Holly Road (part of NC 27), Nations Ford Road, Nevin Road, Oaklawn Avenue, Park Road, Pineville–Matthews Road (part of NC 51), The Plaza, Providence Road (part of NC 16), Queens Road, Randhiolph Road, Rea Road, Remount Road, Rozzelles Ferry Road, Runnymeade Lane, Sardis Road, Scaleybark Road, Selwyn Avenue, Sharon Road, Sharon-Amity Road, South Boulevard, Statesville Road (part of US 21), Steele Creek Road (part of NC 160), Stonewall Street, Sugar Creek Road, Sunset Road, Tremont Avenue, Tuckaseegee Road, Tyvola Road, University City Boulevard (part of NC 49), W.T. Harris Boulevard (part of NC 24), Wendover Road, West Boulevard (part of NC 160), Westinghouse Boulevard, Wilkinson Boulevard (part of US 74) and Woodlawn Road.

Intercity rail
Charlotte is served daily by three Amtrak routes.

The Crescent train connects Charlotte with New York, Philadelphia, Baltimore, Washington, Charlottesville, and Greensboro to the north, and Atlanta, Birmingham and New Orleans to the south. It arrives overnight once in each direction.

The Carolinian train connects Charlotte with New York, Philadelphia, Baltimore, Washington, Richmond, Raleigh, Durham and Greensboro. Charlotte is the southern terminus, with the northbound train leaving just before the morning rush and the southbound train arriving in the evening.

The Piedmont train, a regional companion of the Carolinian, connects Charlotte with Raleigh, Durham and Greensboro via three daily round trips.

The Charlotte Amtrak station is located at 1914 North Tryon Street beside the Norfolk Southern railyard.

The city is currently building a new centralized multimodal train station called Gateway Station. It is expected to house Amtrak, Greyhound, the future LYNX light rail lines, Red Line, and the CityLYNX Gold Line.

History

 Charlotte station (Seaboard Air Line Railroad)

See also

References

External links

 
Charlotte, North Carolina